Kesun Mitchell Loder (born May 1993), better known by his stage name, K'Sun Ray, is an American actor. He is known for starring as Timmy Robinson in the 2006 zombie film Fido.

Personal life
K'Sun was born in May 1993, as Kesun Loder in the United States. His career began in 2004, after he was cast in a starring role in the television movie Love's Enduring Promise.

He was arrested on October 16, 2011 in Wilmington, NC on attempted burglary charges.

Filmography

Feature films
Fido (2006) as Timothy "Timmy" Robinson

Made-for-television films
Love's Enduring Promise (2004) as Aaron Davis
Fielder's Choice (2005) as Zachary "Zach"
A Smile as Big as the Moon (2012)

Television
In Justice (2006) as Tyler "Ty" Buckner
1 episode: "Cost of Freedom"
Criminal Minds (2007) as Young Tobias Henkel
2 episodes: "The Big Game" and " Revelations"
Smith (2007) as Jason Smith
5 episodes: "Pilot", "Two", "Four", "Six" and "Seven"
Heartland (2007) as Andrew "Andy" Wyles
1 episode: "Picking Up Little Things"
Monk (2007) as James "Jimmy" Krenshaw
1 episode: "Mr. Monk and the Daredevil"
Life is Wild (2007-2008) as Chase Clarke
7 episodes: "Pilot", "Open for Business", "Heritage Day", "Bad to the Bone", "Games People Play", "The Heart Wants What It Wants" and "Rescue Me"
CSI: Crime Scene Investigation (2009) as Alexander "Alex" Palento
1 episode: "The Grave Shift"
ER (2009) as Felix Kirsch
1 episode: "I Feel Good"
Three Rivers (2009) as Roger Downing
1 episode: "The Luckiest Man"

References

External links

1993 births
Living people
American male television actors
American male child actors